Heidi Marie Tjugum (born 5 September 1973) is a Norwegian team handball player and goalkeeper, and World Champion from 1999. She was born in Drammen. She received a silver medal at the 1992 Summer Olympics in Barcelona. She received a bronze medal at the 2000 Summer Olympics in Sydney. 

Norwegian Champion x 2: 1992 and 2003
Danish Champion x 4: 1998, 1999, 2000, 2001
German Cup: 2007

References

External links

1973 births
Living people
Norwegian female handball players
Olympic handball players of Norway
Handball players at the 1992 Summer Olympics
Handball players at the 1996 Summer Olympics
Handball players at the 2000 Summer Olympics
Sportspeople from Drammen
Olympic silver medalists for Norway
Olympic bronze medalists for Norway
Viborg HK players
Olympic medalists in handball
Medalists at the 2000 Summer Olympics
Medalists at the 1992 Summer Olympics